Meyrick's banana hedyleptan moth (Omiodes meyrickii) is a species of moth in the family Pyralidae. It was described by Otto Herman Swezey in 1907 and is endemic to the island of Oʻahu in Hawaiʻi.

The larvae feed on banana. Young larvae feed gregariously on the under surface of a banana leaf along the side of the midrib. They spin a slight web for mutual protection, being covered by this and their excrement which is caught and retained by the web. They eat the lower epidermis and the parenchyma of the leaf, leaving the upper epidermis, making it look like dead spots in the leaf where they have fed. When about half grown, they eat the whole substance of the leaf making a ragged appearance. At this point they become more separated and roll up the edge of the leaf to create a retreat. Full-grown larvae are 32–35 mm long and light green.

The pupa is formed inside a slight cocoon, made in the retreat of the larvae, or some other convenient place for seclusion and shelter. It is 14–17 mm long. The pupal period lasts about 11 days.

Sources
 

Moths described in 1907
Endemic moths of Hawaii
Omiodes
Taxonomy articles created by Polbot
Taxobox binomials not recognized by IUCN